Dennis Leroy Hof (October 14, 1946 – October 16, 2018) was an American brothel owner. He owned seven legal brothels in Nevada, most notably the Moonlite BunnyRanch. Hof was also a Republican candidate in 2018 for the Nevada Assembly, which he was posthumously elected to less than one month after his death.

Career
Before entering into the brothel business, Hof owned gas stations, first in Arizona and later in Nevada.

The Moonlite Bunny Ranch

Hof purchased and remodeled The Moonlite BunnyRanch in 1992, a brothel that had been founded in 1955; he then purchased a second brothel, Kitty's, and renamed it The Love Ranch North. Hof later purchased two additional brothels from longtime Nye County brothel proprietor Joe Richards: the Cherry Patch in Crystal, Nevada, renamed the Love Ranch Vegas, and the Cherry Patch II in Amargosa Valley, Nevada, renamed the Alien Cathouse. On September 8, 2018, it was announced that the Alien Cathouse had been sold to business owner Raman Sharma.

Despite Nevada laws banning brothel advertising, Hof maintained a high profile to create publicity for his brothels. He was the president of the Nevada Brothel Owners' Association and its lobbyist; the Bunny Ranch is the closest brothel to the state capital, Carson City.

Hof operated a website; the "working girls" are encouraged to cultivate online relationships with both potential and past clients. He often appeared on talk shows, including Oprah Winfrey, The Today Show, The View, Fox News, Howard Stern, Lex and Terry, and many others. Hof employed adult film stars, including Sunset Thomas with whom he also had a romantic relationship. He also gave free offers to soldiers returning from duty.

In early 2009, due to the recession, State Senator Bob Coffin (D) proposed legalizing prostitution statewide for tax purposes. Hof was prominently featured in a number of media reports saying he would expand into Las Vegas given the opportunity, and was looking at some closed casinos as property. However, the Nevada lawmakers chose not to consider the proposal of statewide legal prostitution during that legislative session.

Series
Hof and the Moonlite Bunny Ranch brothel were featured in the HBO series Cathouse, which ran from 2002 to 2014. Two documentary series followed: Cathouse: The Series premiered in 2005, and Cathouse 2: Back in the Saddle appeared in 2007.

Both featured a look at the inner workings of a legal house of prostitution as well as the life of a number of the working girls, borrowing some techniques from reality television, such as camera-only interviews and staged spontaneity.

Filmography
Hof appears as himself in an "underground" mall shop called "Pro-Life Sex" in the 2014 indie film Alongside Night. In 1998, Hof was in the Hughes Brothers documentary American Pimp, where notably he was the only white man the brothers interviewed. At one point in the documentary, he very nearly accurately predicted his own death, going out getting the best piece of pussy.

Public speaking and television appearances
Hof had speaking engagements at Oxford University and Trinity College, Dublin. The New Yorker ran an 11-page article by Rebecca Mead about him, entitled "American Pimp", in 2001.

Hof appeared on Walton and Johnson, Brand X with Russell Brand, Rover's Morning Glory, The Johnny Dare Morning Show, Todd and Tyler, American Pimp, The Tyra Banks Show, Lex and Terry, the Opie and Anthony Show, The Adam Carolla Show, The Howard Stern Show, The Mike Calta Show, Loveline with Stryker and Dr. Drew, Derek and Romaine, and on Dr. Phil, as well as giving a tour and interview to conservative pundit Sean Hannity on Hannity and Colmes.

Author
Hof released a book, The Art of the Pimp, in March 2015. The memoir includes personal accounts from women who worked for him, in which they detail sexual abuse at his hands. It also includes a psychological profile of Hof from psychotherapist Sheenah Hankin. Hankin found him to be a narcissist with no empathy, and states of his relationships with his employees, "Like any pimp, he exploits them. This is sadistic behavior, and it is both unrecognized and denied."

Legal problems
In 1999, Lyon County sheriff's deputy Brian Putzer filed a police report accusing Hof of death threats. According to Deputy Putzer, the threats were spurred when Putzer did a routine walk-through check of one of Hof's brothels and discovered documents showing that Hof was setting up sexual encounters in counties where prostitution is illegal. Putzer states that his superiors "didn't want to challenge Hof" as the county is poorly funded and Hof's brothels were a major contributor to the local economy.

In 2016, a woman who had formerly worked for Hof, Jennifer O'Kane, publicly accused Hof of nonconsensual sexual contact, rape, sexual harassment, and having sex with his workers without a condom. O'Kane stated that Hof regularly gets away with the sexual abuse of his employees due to their status as sex workers, and that she had reported the rape to the D.A.'s office in 2011, but nothing had been pursued. The accusations were similar to statements made in Hof's own memoir by former Hof employees Krissy Summers and Cami Parker, who noted abusive behavior and coerced sexual encounters in the brothel. A detective interviewed O'Kane regarding the accusations but charges were not pursued as there were no other direct witnesses and Hof was running for political office at the time. Deputy District Attorney Katrina Samuels again declined to prosecute the case in 2018, stating that the statute of limitations had passed.

In December 2017, another former employee, Diana Grandmaison, reported a non-consensual sexual encounter with Hof to the same detective who had investigated the O'Kane case. Grandmaison stated that Hof regularly initiated such encounters with the young girls who worked for him and detailed other forms of work abuse. No further action was taken.

Politics
Hof endorsed Ron Paul in the 2008 and 2012 presidential elections. He joined the Libertarian Party in 2015. In December 2016, he became a "Trump Republican".

In 2016 and 2018, Hof ran for the 36th District seat in the Nevada Assembly, the lower house of the state legislature – the first time as a Libertarian and the second time as a Republican; he lost the first race to James Oscarson, but defeated him in the GOP primary in 2018. Hof prevailed in the primary after Nye County officials attempted to remove his campaign signs. However, in an emergency motion before the Federal District of Nevada, Hof prevailed in a First Amendment claim against the county. He was represented in that matter by First Amendment attorney Marc Randazza. After winning the primary Hof styled himself as the "Trump from Pahrump."

Hof died October 16, 2018, just two days after his 72nd birthday and less than a month before the 2018 general election. His name remained on the ballot (with polling places posting public signage stating that Hof was deceased), and he posthumously won election to the seat over his Democratic opponent, Lesia Romanov, by a 68.3% to 31.7% margin; under Nevada state law, the seat was declared vacant. County commissioners from Lincoln, Nye and Clark counties conducted a weighted vote to determine Hof's replacement. The seat was given to Gregory Hafen II, general manager of a local utility company founded by his grandfather.

Electoral history

2016

2018

Personal life
In Cathouse: The Musical, Hof revealed that he only dated prostitutes. "I don't date civilians [non-working girls]." The documentary series showed several of his relationships with employees, such as adult film star Sunset Thomas and Heidi Fleiss. In his memoir, Hof disclosed a lack of interest in monogamy and detailed how every one of his relationships ended due to his own infidelity. Hof was a close friend of Fox News personality Tucker Carlson. He once stated that he communicated with Carlson daily to give him ideas for his show.

Death
Hof died in his sleep at his Love Ranch South in Crystal, Nevada, on October 16, 2018, following a party for his 72nd birthday that had been attended by Joe Arpaio, Heidi Fleiss, Grover Norquist, and Ron Jeremy, the last of whom found Hof unresponsive. Police did not suspect foul play at the time of his death, and no one who was with him the night before noticed any signs of ill-health. Hof's legislature campaign manager Chuck Muth said that Hof was "having the time of his life" that night. The death was later reported to have been caused by a heart attack due to "atherosclerotic and hypertensive cardiovascular disease."

See also
 Prostitution in Nevada

References

External links
 Campaign website
 
 

1946 births
2018 deaths
American brothel owners and madams
American pimps
American sex industry businesspeople
Brothels in Nevada
Businesspeople from Phoenix, Arizona
Businesspeople from Nevada
Republican Party members of the Nevada Assembly
Nevada Libertarians
People from Carson City, Nevada
Politicians elected posthumously
Politicians from Phoenix, Arizona
Prostitution in Nevada
Writers from Nevada
Writers from Phoenix, Arizona
20th-century American businesspeople
21st-century American businesspeople